Knox City High School is a public high school situated on the north edge of Knox City, Texas United States and classified as a 1A school by the UIL. It is part of the Knox City-O'Brien Consolidated Independent School District located in southwestern Knox County. In 2015, the school was rated "Met Standard" by the Texas Education Agency. The school was also mentioned on the hit Comedy Central show Tosh.0, after a promotional video for the school's 6-man football team went viral.

Athletics
The Knox City Greyhounds compete in these sports - 

Baseball
Basketball
6-Man Football
Golf
Tennis
Track and Field
Volleyball

State Titles
Football 
1983(1A)

Notable alumni
 Danny Balis - radio personality, musician, raconteur. Aliases include "Dingu" and "The Black Cloud"

References

External links
Knox City-O'Brien Consolidated ISD website
List of Six-man football stadiums in Texas

Schools in Knox County, Texas
Public high schools in Texas